Bretel is a surname. Notable people with the surname include:

Andrés Bretel (born 24 June 1978), Peruvian musician and record producer
Jacques Bretel (13th century), French trouvère (troubadour)
Jehan Bretel (c.1210–1272), French trouvère (troubadour)

See also
Brettell